The Christmas Anna Angel is a 1944 picture book by Ruth Sawyer and illustrated by Kate Seredy. The story takes place in Hungary during World War II as a girl Anna hopes for a Christmas miracle. The book was a recipient of a 1945 Caldecott Honor for its illustrations.

References

1944 children's books
American picture books
Caldecott Honor-winning works
Viking Press books